José María Cabo Puig (17 July 1907 – 10 December 1991) was a Spanish footballer and manager. He played as a goalkeeper notably for Real Madrid, Atlético Madrid and RCD Espanyol.

External links

 José Maria Cabo profile
 Bio (in Spanish)

1907 births
People from Horta Nord
Sportspeople from the Province of Valencia
Spanish footballers
Year of death missing
Association football goalkeepers
Real Madrid CF players
RCD Espanyol footballers
Atlético Madrid footballers
Spanish football managers
UE Lleida managers
Catalonia international footballers
La Liga players